Brod, Haskovo Province, home of "Brodskiq" or more known as "Dani Boreca from Brod", is a village in the municipality of Dimitrovgrad, in Haskovo Province, in southern Bulgaria.

References

Villages in Haskovo Province